There Are No Fakes is a Canadian documentary film, directed by Jamie Kastner and released in 2019. Starting with musician Kevin Hearn's lawsuit against the Maslak McLeod Gallery after being informed that a Norval Morrisseau painting he had purchased appeared to be a forgery, the film expands into an exposé of a significant art fraud ring that has produced many fake Morrisseau paintings through the use of forced child labour in sweatshops, in which some of Morrisseau's own surviving family members are complicit; by some estimates, there may be up to 10 times as much fake Morrisseau art on the market as real work.

At the time of the film's release, Hearn's lawsuit had been dismissed by the courts on the grounds that he could not definitively prove that the painting was fake; in September 2019, the decision was overturned by the Ontario Court of Appeal, which awarded Hearn $60,000 on the grounds that the legal onus was actually on the gallery owner to prove that the painting was real, which he also could not do.

The film premiered at the Hot Docs Canadian International Documentary Festival in 2019. It received selected other theatrical screenings through 2019, including at the Art Gallery of Ontario in Toronto, the Glenbow Museum in Calgary and the Thunder Bay Art Gallery in Thunder Bay. It had its television premiere on TVOntario on February 1, 2020.

Reception 
There Are No Fakes was released on April 29, 2019 at the Hot Docs International Documentary Film Festival. Critical reception to the film was varied. The Winnipeg Free Press says that despite being "overly long" at points, it is "is a stunning picture of colonial exploitation and stolen Indigenous patrimony". The Globe and Mail described There Are No Fakes as "a shocking tale of counterfeit art, sexual abuse and colonialist exploitation."

L.A Hawbaker offered in their review for PopMatters that Kastner uses There Are No Fakes to emphasize the fact that those benefitting from Morriseau's work were white men. They then go on to say that "the crimes that took place at the Bingwi reserve are just a small sampling of the societal harm done to indigenous populations in Canada".

In 2023, the Ontario Provincial Police filed for a court order demanding that Kastner turn over all of the film's raw footage in order to assist in their investigation.

Awards

References

External links
 

2019 films
2019 documentary films
Canadian documentary films
Documentary films about organized crime
Documentary films about First Nations
Films about art forgery
Films directed by Jamie Kastner
2010s English-language films
2010s Canadian films